Billy Martin (born October 30, 1963) is an American jazz drummer, best known as a member of jazz-funk trio Medeski Martin & Wood.

Biography
Before becoming part of Medeski, Martin & Wood, Martin was part of the New York City Brazilian scene in the 1980s. He performed regularly with Pe De Boi, Batucada and several Bob Moses bands for over a decade. He also joined Chuck Mangione's touring group for three years. Most notably he has developed as a percussionist for The Lounge Lizards and with the John Lurie National Orchestra, and has collaborated with artists such as John Zorn, DJ Logic, Dave Burrell and Miho Hatori. He has also started his own record label, Amulet Records, specializing in eclectic percussion albums. Martin has also collaborated with Iggy Pop, Eyvind Kang, Chris Whitley, DJ Olive, Ikue Mori, John Scofield, Maceo Parker, Calvin Weston, Marty Ehrlich, and Min Xiao-Fen.

Martin also sometimes goes by the moniker Illy B. The most notable releases as Illy B include the Illy B Eats series of breakbeat records. DJ Logic convinced Martin to record a breakbeat album for DJs and other producers to use and remix. At the last minute, Martin decided to place an insert which invited remixers to submit their mixes for a follow up compilation, Drop the Needle.

Along with his percussion work, Martin is a visual artist. He does printmaking, painting, pencil drawings, and pastel drawings, among other mediums. His work has been displayed in several galleries and is also on the packaging of many Medeski Martin & Wood albums, most notably the cover of Shack-man.

2006 was a prolific year for Martin; he created new chamber compositions for John Zorn's Tzadik label, he released Out Louder on MMW's new label Indirecto, he produced many new artworks, and published a drum book entitled Riddim: Clave of African Origin.

on DVD
"Billy Martin's LIFE ON DRUMS" (VongoleFilms.com)
"Billy Martin IN CONCERT" (VongoleFilms.com)

Discography

Bob Moses
Visit with the Great Spirit (1983, Gramavision)
Drummingbirds (1984, Amulet)
The Story of Moses (1987, Gramavision)
Time Stood Still (1993, Gramavision)

Ned Rothenberg
Overlays (1991, Moers)
Real and Imagined Time (1995, Moers)

John Lurie and the Lounge Lizards
Live in Berlin Vol. 1 & 2 audio and film (1991)
The John Lurie National Orchestra – Men with Sticks (1993)
Get Shorty soundtrack (1995)
Fishing with John soundtrack (1998)
African Swim/Manny and Low soundtrack (1999)
The Legendary Marvin Pontiac (1999)

Medeski Martin and Wood
Notes from the Underground (1991, Amulet)
It's a Jungle in Here (1993, Gramavision/Ryko)
Friday Afternoon in the Universe (1995, Gramavision/Ryko)
Get Shorty soundtrack (1995)
Shack-man (1996, Gramavision/Ryko)
Farmer's Reserve (1996, Indirecto/Amulet)
Wim Wender's The End of Violence soundtrack (1997)
Great Jewish Music: Serge Gainsbourg (1997, Tzadik)
Great Jewish Music – Burt Bacharach (1997, Tzadik)
Great Jewish Music: Marc Bolan (1998, Tzadik)
Combustication (1998, Blue Note)
Last Chance to Dance Trance (1999)
Tonic (2000, Blue Note)
The Dropper (2000, Blue Note)
Uninvisible (2002, Blue Note)
End of the World Party (2004, Blue Note)
Voices in the Wilderness (2003, Tzadik)
Let's Go Everywhere (2008)
Radiolarians 1 (2008)
Radiolarians 2 (2009)
Radiolarians 3  (2009)
Radiolarians: The Evolutionary Set  (2009)
The Stone: Issue Four  (2010) – CD to benefit The Stone; live in Japan
20  (March – December 2011) – collection of tracks (released monthly); celebrating MMW's 20 year anniversary
Free Magic (2012) – acoustic live album, recorded in 2007
Juice (2014)

Iggy Pop
Avenue B (1999, Virgin)

Oren Bloedow
Luckiest Boy in the World (1998, Knitting Factory Works)

Chris Whitley
Perfect Day (2000)

John Scofield
A Go Go (1998, Verve)
Out Louder (2006, Indirecto)

Samm Bennett and Chunk
Life of Crime (1991, Knitting Factory Works)

As soloist and chamber music composer
Starlings (2006, Tzadik)
Black Elk Speaks (2001, Amulet)
Solo Live Tonic (2002, Amulet)

Illy B Eats
Illy B Eats Vol. 1 – Groove Bang and Jive Around (2001, Amulet)
Drop the Needle (2001, Amulet)
Antidote (2002, Amulet)
The Turntable Sessions Vol. 1 (2002, Amulet)
Illy B Eats Vol. 2 (Amulet)
Illy B Eats Vol. 3 (Amulet)

Socket
January 14 & 15 (2005, Amulet)

Dave Burrell
Consequences (2006, Amulet)

G. Calvin Weston
Percussion Duets (1996, Amulet)
Houston Hall (2006, Amulet)

DJ Spooky
Optometry (2002, Thirsty Ear)

DJ Logic
For No One in Particular (2003, Amulet)
Project Logic (1999, Rope-a-Dope)
Global Noize (2008, Shanachie Recordings)

Healing Sound series
Falling Water (1997, Amulet)

Wil Blades
Shimmy (2012, Royal Potato Family)

Wicked Knee
Wicked Knee (2011, Amulet)
Heels Over Head (2013, Amulet)

External links 
 Billy Martin official website
 Medeski Martin & Wood official website
 Amulet Records website
 Riddim drum book website
 Martin's online art exhibit
 Starlings on John Zorn's Tzadik imprint
  Information on Drop the Needle
 Interview with Billy Martin
 Knee Deep in the Groove: An Interview with Billy Martin via TheWaster.com 

Avant-garde jazz musicians
American jazz drummers
Living people
Modern artists
American percussionists
1963 births
Tzadik Records artists
20th-century American drummers
American male drummers
20th-century American male musicians
American male jazz musicians
The Lounge Lizards members
Medeski Martin & Wood members